The 2022 Sukma Games, officially known as the 20th Sukma Games  and commonly known as MSN 2022, was a multi-sport event that was held in Kuala Lumpur from 16 September until 24 September 2022. The Games were originally scheduled to be held in Johor in July 2020. However, they were postponed until 2022 due to the COVID-19 pandemic, with the National Sports Council (NSC) replacing Johor as host.

Venues
All sporting events were held in the Klang Valley area, except for Sailing which was held in Langkawi, Kedah.

Kuala Lumpur
 Jalan Duta Sports Complex - Tennis
 Jalan Duta Squash Complex - Squash
 Kuala Lumpur Petanque Arena - Petanque
 Bukit Kiara Sports Complex
 Juara Stadium - Netball
 National Lawn bowls Centre - Lawn bowls
 KL Sports City
 Bukit Jalil National Stadium - Athletics
 Axiata Arena - Badminton
 Malaysia National Hockey Stadium - Hockey
 National Aquatic Centre - Aquatics (Diving, Swimming)
 National Squash Centre - Squash
 National Sports Council Gymnasium 1 - Gymnastics (Rhythmic)
 National Sports Council Gymnasium 2 - Wushu
 National Sports Council Gymnasium 3 - Gymnastics (Artistic)
 Kuala Lumpur Stadium - Football
 Malaysia Basketball Association Stadium - Basketball
 Quill City Mall - E-sports
 University of Malaya - Football

Selangor
 Shah Alam City Council Section 4 Hall - Volleyball
 Shah Alam City Council Section 19 Hall - Volleyball
 Shah Alam City Council Section 19 Beach volleyball Venue - Beach volleyball
 National University of Malaysia Football Field - Football
 National University of Malaysia Oval - Cricket
 National University of Malaysia Dataran Gemilang Square - Opening and closing ceremonies
 Universiti Teknologi MARA Football Field - Football
 Universiti Teknologi MARA Sports Complex Hall - Judo, Karate
 Universiti Teknologi MARA Rugby Field - Rugby sevens
 Universiti Tenaga Nasional Football Field - Football
 Universiti Tenaga Nasional Dewan Sri Sarjana Hall - Sepak takraw
 Selangor Turf Club - Cricket
 South City Plaza, Seri Kembangan - Muay Thai
 Subang National Golf Club - Golf
 Subang National Shooting Range - Shooting
 Sunway Pyramid - Bowling

Putrajaya
 Precinct 18 Futsal Complex - Boxing
 Precinct 6 Water Sports Complex - Canoeing
 Precinct 11 Neighbourhood Complex - Weightlifting
 Putrajaya Challenge Park - Cycling (Mountain biking)

Negeri Sembilan
 Bandar Sri Sendayan, Seremban - Cycling (road)
 National Velodrome of Malaysia, Nilai - Cycling (BMX, Track)
 Universiti Sains Islam Malaysia Stadium - Archery
 Universiti Sains Islam Malaysia Dewan Tuanku Canselor Hall - Pencak silat

Kedah
 National Sailing Training Centre, Langkawi - Sailing

Athletes' villages
 Universiti Teknologi MARA Shah Alam Main Campus
 Universiti Tenaga Nasional, Kajang
 National University of Malaysia, Bangi
 University of Malaya, Kuala Lumpur
 Dayang Bay Service Apartment & Resort, Langkawi
 Malaysia Paralympic Sports Excellence Centre, Kampung Pandan (Demonstration sports)

The games

Participating states

Sports

 Aquatics

 
 
 
  
 3×3 Basketball
 5×5 Basketball
 
 
 
  
 
 Road
 Track
 BMX
 Mountain bike
 
 
 
 Gymnastics
 
 
   
  
 
 
  
  
  
  Petanque

Demonstration sports

Calendar

Medal table

External links
Official site
Result system

References

Sukma Games
Sukma
Sukma
Sport in Kuala Lumpur